Riho Ühtegi (born 15 February 1964) is an Estonian brigadier general. He has been the Commander of the Estonian Special Operations Force. Since 2019, he is the commander of the Estonian Defence League.

Military career
Ühtegi is a member of the Estonian Defence League since 1990. and is one of the establishers of Elva malevkond, which was the first unit in Tartu malev. During 1991 Soviet coup d'état attempt he participated in the defence of Toompea with men from Tartu malev. In 1993, during Pullapää crisis, he was tasked with creating a new unit based on the Lääne Country Volunteer Jaeger Company. He replaced Toivo Treima as chief of J2 department of the Estonian Defence Forces on 6 April 1995, after a border incident involving an officer from the department. On 26 February 2007, he was released from the position of Commander of the Military Intelligence Battalion due to a scandal over illegal tracking. He was given the rank of lieutenant colonel on 14 October 2010 and the rank of colonel on 22 February 2016. In 2016, he was involved in a helicopter accident, but escaped largely unharmed.
Ühtegi was approved for the position of Commander of the Defence League by the Estonian Government on June 13, 2019, eventually taking up the position on July 19. On August 20, he received the rank of brigadier general.

1982-1984 Conscript service in the Soviet Army
1991-1993 Service in Estonian Police Forces as a platoon commander
1993-1994 Company commander in the Estonian Defence Forces
1994-1995 Chief of section in Intelligence Department of the Headquarters of the Estonian Defence Forces
1995-2006 Chief of Intelligence Department of the Headquarters of the Estonian Defence Forces
1998-2006 Commander of the Military Intelligence Battalion
2006 Team leader on a foreign mission (ISAF)
2006-2007 Commander of the Military Intelligence Battalion
2007-2008 Lecturer in a Military Academy, chair of tactics of brigade and battalion
2008-2010 Chief of Intelligence Department of the Army Staff
2010 Contingent commander on a foreign mission (ISAF)
2011 Chief of Intelligence Department of the Army Staff
2011-2012 Defence Attaché of the Republic of Estonia in Georgia
2012-2019 Commander of Estonian Special Operations Force 
2019–present Commander of the Estonian Defence League

Education

1982 graduated from Elva Gymnasium 
1994 graduated from Officers’ Training Course in National Defense Academy
1996 graduated from the Netherlands’ Staff College, International Staff Officers’ Course
1998 graduated from G. Marshall Center in Germany, International Defense and Security Studies’ Course
2003 graduated from Baltic Defence College, Colonels’ course 
2007 graduated from University of Tartu  (Law MA)

Personal life

Riho Ühtegi is married and has two children. After serving in the Soviet Army, he worked as a telescope mechanic at Tartu Observatory and later as a policeman, during which he joined the Estonian Defence League. His hobbies are sports, which he practices to keep in shape, and teaching subjects about national defence. Many secondary school national defence teachers have attended his lectures. He has participated in the translation of Silent Warfare: Understanding the World of Intelligence by Abram Shulsky and Gary Schmitt.

Decorations

The Cross of the Eagle, 4th Class Order
The Cross of the Eagle, 5th Class Order
Golden badge of the Ministry of Defence
Badge of Merit of the Estonian Defence Forces
Defence Long-service Medal (EDF)
Defence Distinguished Service Cross (EDF)
Service Medal of the Headquarters of the Estonian Defence Forces
Service Medal of the Army Staff
10 years of restored Defence Forces Memorial Medal
White Cross of the Estonian Defence League, 4th Class Order
Service Medal of the Estonian Defence League, 1st Class
Service Medal of the Estonian Defence League, 2nd Class
Medal of Special Services of the Estonian Defence League
Medal for participation in international peacekeeping operations
Medal of NATO Non-article 5 operations, Georgian medal of General Kvinitadze
US Marine paratroopers' badge
French paratroopers' badge 3rd Class
German paratroopers' badge 3rd Class
Estonian paratroopers' badge 1st Class
Medal of Special Services of the Estonian Defence Forces
Estonian Defence Forces Service Medal
Badge of service of the Army Staff
Badge of Service of the Estonian Defence League
Badge of service of the Intelligence Battalion

References

External links
Politico interview with Riho Ühtegi

1964 births
Living people
People from Tartu
Estonian brigadier generals
University of Tartu alumni
Recipients of the Military Order of the Cross of the Eagle, Class IV
Recipients of the Military Order of the Cross of the Eagle, Class V